Papilio weymeri is a species of swallowtail butterfly in the Papilioninae subfamily that is endemic to Papua New Guinea where it is found on Los Negros and Manus Islands.

Description
Both sexes have cream fringe spots but only females have orange-red eyespot and dark coloured scales.

Taxonomy
Papilio weymeri is a member of the aegeus species group. The clade members are
Papilio aegeus Donovan, 1805
Papilio bridgei Mathew, 1886
 ? Papilio erskinei Mathew, 1886
Papilio gambrisius Cramer, [1777]
Papilio inopinatus Butler, 1883
Papilio ptolychus Godman & Salvin, 1888
Papilio tydeus C. & R. Felder, 1860
Papilio weymeri Niepelt, 1914
Papilio woodfordi Godman & Salvin, 1888

References

Ebner, J.A., 1971 Some notes on the Papilionidae of Manus Island, New Guinea 1971 Journal of the Lepidopterists' Society 1971 Volume 25:73-80  Discussion of synonymy with Papilio carteriti Oberthür, short description, note on behaviour.

weymeri
Insects of Papua New Guinea
Taxonomy articles created by Polbot
Butterflies described in 1914